Vincenzo Picardi (born October 20, 1983 in Casoria) is an Italian professional boxer best known for winning a bronze medal in the flyweight division both at the 2007 World Amateur Boxing Championships in Chicago and at the 2008 Olympics.

He failed to qualify for the 2004 Summer Olympics, finishing in third place at the 3rd AIBA European 2004 Olympic Qualifying Tournament in Gothenburg, Sweden.

At the 2006 European Championships he lost in the first round to favorite Samir Mammadov.

A year later at the 2007 World Championships he reached the semis, where he lost to Thai star Somjit Jongjohor (2:13).

At the Boxing at the 2008 Summer Olympics he again lost to Jongjohor.

At the 2009 Worlds in his own country he lost his first bout to a Mongolian.

He won the bronze medal at the 2010 European Amateur Boxing Championships in Moscow, Russia after he lost to Misha Aloyan from Russia in the Semis.

Olympic games results 
2008 (as a flyweight)
Defeated Cassius Chiyanika (Zambia) 10-3
Defeated Juan Carlos Payano (Dominican Republic) 8-4
Defeated Walid Cherif (Tunisia) 7-5
Lost to Somjit Jongjohor (Thailand) 1-7

2012 (as a flyweight)
 First round bye
 Lost to Tugstsogt Nyambayar (Mongolia) 16-17

World amateur championships results 
2005 (as a flyweight)
Defeated Toshiyuki Igarashi (Japan) 29-9
Lost to Samir Mammadov (Azberbaijan) 19-36

2007 (as a flyweight)
Defeated Kadri Kordel (Turkey) 22-7
Defeated Katsuaki Susa (Japan) 24-14
Defeated Anuruddha Rathnayake (Sri Lanka) 23-4
Lost to Somjit Jongjohor (Thailand) 2-13 (semifinal)

References

External links 
 
 
 

1983 births
Sportspeople from the Province of Naples
Boxers at the 2008 Summer Olympics
Boxers at the 2012 Summer Olympics
Olympic boxers of Italy
Flyweight boxers
Olympic bronze medalists for Italy
Living people
Olympic medalists in boxing
Medalists at the 2008 Summer Olympics
Italian male boxers
Boxers at the 2015 European Games
European Games silver medalists for Italy
European Games medalists in boxing
AIBA World Boxing Championships medalists
Mediterranean Games silver medalists for Italy
Mediterranean Games medalists in boxing
Competitors at the 2013 Mediterranean Games
Boxers of Fiamme Oro
21st-century Italian people